The 1913 Kilkenny Senior Hurling Championship was the 24th staging of the Kilkenny Senior Hurling Championship since its establishment by the Kilkenny County Board.

On 12 October 1913, Mooncoin won the championship after a 5-07 to 3-04 defeat of Tullaroan in the final. This was their fifth championship title overall and their first in five championship seasons.

Results

Final

References

Kilkenny Senior Hurling Championship
Kilkenny Senior Hurling Championship